Adult Contemporary is a chart published by Billboard ranking the top-performing songs in the United States in the adult contemporary music (AC) market.  In 1996, five different songs topped the chart in 52 issues of the magazine, based on weekly airplay data from radio stations compiled by Nielsen Broadcast Data Systems.  The chart was published under the title Hot Adult Contemporary through the issue of Billboard dated March 9 and Adult Contemporary thereafter.

For the first ten months of the year, only three songs occupied the top spot, each of which had an unbroken run of at least 12 weeks at number one.  In the year's first issue of Billboard the number one position was held by "One Sweet Day", a collaboration between Mariah Carey and Boyz II Men, which retained its position from the last chart of 1995.  The R&B ballad held the top spot for the first 12 weeks of 1996 for a final total of 13 weeks at number one, a new record for the Adult Contemporary listing.  "One Sweet Day" also topped Billboards all-genre chart, the Hot 100, for a record-breaking 16 weeks.  In a 2011 poll, the readers of music magazine Rolling Stone voted it the best collaboration of all time.  The song's record for the longest stay atop the AC chart was broken, however, by the very next track to reach number one.  In the issue of Billboard dated March 30, "One Sweet Day" was displaced from the top spot by "Because You Loved Me" by Canadian singer Celine Dion, which remained at number one for 19 consecutive weeks, another new record.  Dion would return to number one for five weeks beginning in November with "It's All Coming Back to Me Now", meaning that she topped the chart in almost half the issues of Billboard published in 1996.

The third song to have a lengthy run at number one in 1996 was "Change the World" by British singer-guitarist Eric Clapton, from the soundtrack of the film Phenomenon, which replaced "Because You Loved Me" in the top spot in the issue of Billboard dated August 10 and stayed at number one for 13 weeks.  In addition to being a radio hit, the song also won the Grammy Awards for Song of the Year, Record of the Year and Best Male Pop Vocal Performance at the 1997 awards ceremony.  The final number one of 1996 was "When You Love a Woman" by the band Journey, which occupied the top spot for the final three weeks of the year.  The song was taken from the album Trial by Fire, the first release by the band for ten years, but the last to feature longtime lead vocalist Steve Perry, who left the band after its release following a dispute over his refusal to have surgery for a degenerative hip condition.

Chart history

References

See also
1996 in music
List of artists who reached number one on the U.S. Adult Contemporary chart

1996
1996 record charts
1996 in American music